Mutawintji or Mootwingee may refer to:

Mootwingee County
Mootwingee Station
Mutawintji, New South Wales
Mutawintji National Park